Lama Tsedrup Tharchin Rinpoche (1936–July 22, 2013) was a Tibetan Dzogchen master in the Nyingma school of Tibetan Buddhism. He was tenth holder of the family lineage known as the Repkong Ngakpas.

Early life and education
Tharchin Rinpoche was born in southern Tibet in the region of Kongpo. He trained with Nyingma master Dudjom Rinpoche, head of the Nyingma school, at his monastery in Kongpo, Lamaling Monastery. He completed both a five-year and three-year retreat. His other teachers included Chatral Rinpoche, Thinley Norbu Rinpoche, and Sherab Dorje Rinpoche. 

In 1960, he fled Tibet on foot, and lived with his family in India and Nepal for the next 24 years.

Teaching career
In 1984 he moved to the United States and, after being asked by his teacher Dudjom Rinpoche to teach, founded the Vajrayana Foundation and began to teach Tibetan Buddhist dharma in America, where he established a retreat center, Pema Ösel Ling, in Northern California.

Death
Tharchin Rinpoche suffered a sudden heart attack and died on July 22, 2013.

References

External links

Heart Teachings by Lama Tharchin Rinpoche
Lama Tharchin Rinpoche at Rigpa Wiki

1936 births
2013 deaths
Dzogchen lamas
Nyingma lamas
Rinpoches
Ngagpa
Tibetan Buddhists from Tibet
20th-century lamas
21st-century lamas